Hampton is a suburban area on the north bank of the River Thames, in the London Borough of Richmond upon Thames, England, and historically in the County of Middlesex. which includes Hampton Court Palace. Hampton is served by two railway stations, including one immediately south of Hampton Court Bridge in East Molesey.

Hampton adjoins Bushy Park on two sides and is west of Hampton Wick and Kingston upon Thames. There are long strips of public riverside in Hampton and the Hampton Heated Open Air Pool is one of the few such swimming pools in Greater London. The riverside, on the reach above Molesey Lock, has residential islands, a park named St Albans Riverside and grand or decorative buildings including Garrick's House and the Temple to Shakespeare; also on the river is the Astoria Houseboat recording studio. Hampton Ferry provides access across the Thames to the main park of Molesey and the Thames Path National Trail. The Thames Water Hampton Water Treatment Works covers a large expanse of the town in the south west along the river Thames. The site is one of the largest capacity water treatment facilities in Europe producing one-third of London's daily drinking water supply (approximately 650Ml/d).

The most common type of housing in the north of the district is terraced homes; in the south is it semi-detached.  At the western edge of London, many workers commute to adjacent counties, or to Central London; education, health and social work, retail, transport and catering businesses are also significant local employers.

History
The Anglo-Saxon parish of Hampton converted to secular use in the 19th century included present-day Hampton, Hampton Hill, Hampton Wick and hamlet of Hampton Court surrounding Hampton Court Palace which together are called The Hamptons. The combined population of the Hamptons was 37,131 at the 2001 census. The name Hampton may come from the Anglo-Saxon words hamm meaning an enclosure in the bend of a river and ton meaning farmstead or settlement.

The ten years to 1911 saw the highest percentage of population increase, the figures for 1851, 1871 and every 10 years to 1911 being: 3,134; 3,915; 4,776; 5,822, 6,813 and 9,220 respectively. A further 25% rise took place in the 1920s. In his national gazetteer written between 1870 and 1872, John Marius Wilson described Hampton Wick as being technically a hamlet; the real property of which was worth almost as much as the main settlement. Both halves had developed Urban Sanitary Districts recorded in the 1891 census  Hampton and Hampton Wick were Urban Districts from 1894 to 1937, preceding the creation of the Borough of Twickenham, which Hampton joined.

At the edge of London, from time immemorial (before the Norman Conquest) until 1965 Hampton was in Middlesex, a former postal county also and this designation is still common in this part of the former county among residents and businesses.

Tagg's Island and much of Hampton's riverside by association became known as Thames Riviera from the 1920s: the island was leased to Fred Karno, an entertainment impresario, who opened an elevated, three-storey rambling mansard roof hotel, the Karsino in 1913, which was demolished in 1971. World War I impacted the business, which rebranded as The Thames Riviera, rivalling the hotel in Maidenhead for the name, followed by The Palm Beach and The Casino.  The Riviera aspect is sometimes described in literature by the Council however is controversial among dissenters to the land use, almost wholly private housing, where Hampton's riverside is not open parkland – it is no longer endorsed by London's bus operator with a stop of that name, in the 2010s named after instead a long public meadow known as St Albans Riverside.

General Roy

A cannon in Roy Grove marks the Hampton end of the baseline measured in 1784 by General William Roy in preparation of the Anglo-French Survey (1784–1790) to measure the relative situation of Greenwich Observatory and Paris Observatory. This high precision survey was the forerunner of the Principal Triangulation of Great Britain which commenced in 1791, one year after Roy's death. In the report of the operation Roy gives the locations of the ends of the baseline as  Hampton Poor-house and King's Arbour. The latter lies with the confines of Heathrow Airport. The exact end points of the baseline were originally made by two vertical pipes which carried flag-poles but in 1791, when the base was remeasured, the ends were marked  by two cannons sunk into the ground. It is certain that the cannons have been disturbed and slightly moved over the intervening years

Education

Hampton High (previously Hampton Academy, Hampton Community College, Rectory School), an academy
 Hampton School, an independent school for boys
 Lady Eleanor Holles School is an independent school for girls. It is 13th in GCSE results among the top independent schools in the UK.   The latter two schools achieved 100% 5 A*-Cs at GCSE and share a new-for-2000 Millennium Boathouse. Oxford and Cambridge Boat Race and Women's Oxford v Cambridge Henley Boat Race participants of this century have attended the schools.
 Hampton Junior School (which recently celebrated its centenary)
 Hampton Preparatory School (formerly Denmead), the junior school for Hampton School
 Hampton Hill Junior School
 Hampton Infant and Nursery School
 Carlisle Infants school
 Buckingham Primary School
 Twickenham Prep School
 St. Mary's Hampton CE Primary School

Churches
The Christian churches in Hampton and Hampton Hill work together as Churches Together around Hampton. The church buildings are a significant presence in the area many of them being architecturally stand-alone listed buildings in otherwise often quite homogeneous 20th century housing estates. The ministers and members provide a range of services for the community.

The affiliated churches are:
Hampton Methodist Church, Hampton
Hampton Baptist Church, Hampton
Hampton Hill United Reformed Church, Hampton Hill
St Theodore's Roman Catholic Church, Hampton
St Francis de Sales, Hampton Hill and Upper Teddington (Roman Catholic)
All Saints (Church of England), Old Farm Road, Hampton
St Mary (Church of England), Church Street (by Thames Street) Hampton
St James' Church, Hampton Hill (Church of England)

Amenities and entertainment

Garrick's Temple hosts a free Sunday afternoon Shakespeare exhibition (14.00–17.00) from early April to 30 October and a series of summer drama, music and exhibitions.

Hampton Youth Project has been an economically and recreationally resourceful youth centre since 1990. Built in a converted coach depot on the Nurserylands Estate it offers a wide programme of activities for those aged 11–19.  Parks include borough-sponsored football pitches and tennis courts in the north and west of the district and children's playgrounds there and in Bushy Park and Hampton Village Green in the east and south.

Hampton railway station is on the Shepperton branch line and is served by South Western Railway services from London Waterloo to Shepperton.

The library is in a Georgian building on Thames Street with a double blue plaque to two former residents, the singer John Beard and William Ewart MP, the Politician behind the Public Libraries Act 1850.

Economy
Thames Water's fresh water operations provide a source of local employment.  A group of 17 offices and storage premises including warehouse units, which were built in 2008, are in the south-west of the town.

Hampton Water Treatment Works (WTW)

The large operational Water Treatment Works, owned by Thames Water, is between the Upper Sunbury Road (A308) and the River Thames. The works occupy an area of 66 ha and supplies about 30 per cent of London's mains water. It was built in the 1850s after the 1852 Metropolis Water Act made it illegal to take drinking water from the tidal Thames below Teddington Lock because of the amount of sewage in the tidal river. The works were designed by Joseph Quick and initially comprised sand filter beds to remove suspended solids from the river water and three pump houses on Upper Sunbury Road for three water companies — the Grand Junction Waterworks Company, the Southwark and Vauxhall Waterworks Company, and the West Middlesex Waterworks Company. The companies built additional filtration, water storage and steam driven pumping plant until 1902 when they were amalgamated into the Metropolitan Water Board. The Board continued to develop new facilities at Hampton. The site includes Victorian buildings, filter beds and some larger water storage beds.  

The growth of the works is illustrated by the number of reservoirs and filter beds in use, as summarised in the table.

Four of the reservoirs are named: Stain Hill West Reservoir, Stain Hill East Reservoir (combined area 15.39 ha), Sunnyside Reservoir (2.74 ha), and the Grand Junction Reservoir (3.84 ha).

By 1934 the works included a site on the north side of Upper Sunbury Road including four filter beds.

In addition to water abstracted locally from the Thames the works also receives water from other sources. Water is supplied via the Staines Reservoirs Aqueduct (built 1902) from the King George VI Reservoir (1947) and Staines Reservoirs (1902) which receive their water from the River Thames at Hythe End, just above Bell Weir Lock. The aqueduct passes, and transports water from, the Queen Mary Reservoir (1924) and the Water Treatment Works at Kempton Park, which used to be connected to Hampton via the Metropolitan Water Board Railway. Water was also supplied from the Knight and Bessborough Reservoirs (1907) and the Queen Elizabeth II Reservoir (1962) on the opposite (south) side of the Thames. The Hampton works is also the starting point of the Thames-Lea tunnel (1960) which transfers water to the reservoirs in the Lea Valley.

Thames Water completed a five-year modernisation in 1993 and has installed advanced water treatment facilities at the plant to filter out pesticides.

Environment 
The site well demonstrates the successful accommodation of nature conservation with operational considerations. The Water Treatment Works is next to the Sunnyside Reservoir and the Stain Hill Reservoirs – sites of Metropolitan Importance for Nature Conservation and contains flower-rich grassland and habitats for water birds. The extensive areas of open water, especially the Grand Junction Reservoir in the north-west of the site, are used by large numbers of birds, particularly in winter. Most of the site is still in operational use so marginal vegetation, where it occurs, is generally sparse. However, the grasslands surrounding the filter beds and buildings are among the most herb-rich grasslands in the Borough and contain several scarce London species often associated with chalk grassland.

Notable inhabitants

Living people
Evgeny Lebedev, owner of Stud House 
Hayley Mills (born 1946), actress, lived on Belgrade Road, in Hampton with her son Crispian Mills (born 1973), singer, songwriter, guitarist and film director
Bill Milner (born 1995), actor, lives with his family in Hampton
Brian May (born 1947), musician and astrophysicist, born in Hampton

Historical figures

Queen Anne lived at Hampton Court Palace and continued William and Mary's decoration and completion of its state apartments.
John Beard (c.1717–1791), tenor singer, lived at what is now Hampton Branch Library, Rose Hill, Hampton. The site is marked by a blue plaque.
R D Blackmore (1825–1900), novelist, author of Lorna Doone, lived at 25 Lower Teddington Road, Hampton Wick,  whilst he had Gomer House in Teddington (since demolished) built for him.
 John Blow (1649–1708), composer, built a house for himself in the High Street. It was demolished in 1799 and was on the site of the present-day house known as Beveree.
Julian Bream (1933–2020), lutenist and classical guitarist, grew up in Hampton.
Lancelot "Capability" Brown (1716–1783), is commemorated with an English Heritage blue plaque at Wilderness House, Hampton Court Palace. He lived there from 1764, when he was appointed Chief Gardener at the palace, until his death in 1783.
Charles I lived at Richmond Palace and at Hampton Court while the plague raged in London. He was held prisoner at Hampton Court in 1647.
Charles II lived at Hampton Court in 1665 to escape the plague in London.
Sir Richard Doll (1912–2005), epidemiologist, was born in Hampton.
William Ewart (1798–1791), promoter of public libraries, lived at what is now Hampton Branch Library, Rose Hill, Hampton. The site is marked by a blue plaque.
Sir Francis Mark Farmer (1866–1922), a dental surgeon who worked on facial reconstruction, lived in Belgrade Road.  
David Garrick (1717–1779), actor, lived at Garrick's Villa, Hampton Court Road, Hampton.
George I commissioned the completion of six rooms at Hampton Court Palace to the design of John Vanbrugh.
Harry Hampton VC (1870–1922) was born in Crown Terrace, Richmond and died in Twickenham. He is buried in Richmond Old Cemetery.
Henry VI was born at Windsor Palace. 
Henry VIII married Catherine Parr, his sixth wife, at Hampton Court.
Norman Cyril Jackson VC (1919–1994) died in Hampton Hill and is buried in Twickenham Cemetery.
W. E. Johns (1893-1968) was an English First World War pilot, and writer of the Biggles stories, who died at Park House, Hampton Court.
Edward Lapidge (1779–1860), who held the post of County Surveyor of Surrey and designed the present Kingston Bridge, was born in Hampton Wick, where he also designed a number of churches.
Mary I and her consort, Philip II of Spain, spent their honeymoon at Hampton Court and Richmond.
Vic Mitchell (1934–2021), author and publisher, was born in Hampton. 
Jane Seymour, Henry VIII's third wife, gave birth to the future Edward VI of England at Hampton Court Palace and died two weeks later at Richmond Palace.
John Templeton (1802–1886), opera singer, lived at 114 High Street, Hampton Hill.
Alan Turing (1912–1954) lived at Ivy House (which now has a blue plaque) in Hampton High Street between 1945 and 1947 while working at the National Physical Laboratory in Teddington.
William, Duke of Gloucester, son of the future Queen Anne and Prince George of Hanover, was born at Hampton Court in 1689
William III and Mary II rebuilt parts of Hampton Court Palace.
Thomas Wolsey, Cardinal Wolsey (1473–1530), lived at Hampton Court.
Sir Christopher Wren (1632–1723), lived at The Old Court House, Hampton Court Green. The site is marked by a blue plaque.
Xenia Alexandrovna of Russia, sister of Tsar Nicholas II, lived at Wilderness Lodge, in the grounds of Hampton Court Palace, from 1937 until her death in 1960.

Sport and leisure

Team sports
Hampton has a Non-League football club Hampton & Richmond Borough F.C. who play at step 2 of Non-League football in the National League South at the Beveree Stadium by Station Road, one of the parallel high streets by Hampton railway station.

Rugby Union is well catered for within four miles: Twickenham RFC play in the west of Hampton.  Staines RFC and Feltham RFC play at their own Hanworth grounds; London Irish RFC juniors play at Sunbury, London Harlequins RFC play at Twickenham.

Leisure facilities
The borough supports Hampton Heated Open Air Pool and Gym by Bushy Park and the old High Street, 200m south of the border of Hampton Hill.
Private gyms are by Bushy Park and Twickenham Golf Course.
A local community association provide social and leisure activities including short mat bowls.
Watersports
Molesey Boat Club is across the river in Molesey, 500m west of Hampton Court Bridge.

Hampton SC has a clubhouse and boatyard occupying all of Benn's Island. Aquarius SC is by Hampton Court Palace stable yard.

These have rival rowing and sailing clubs on neighbouring reaches of the Thames, and in respect of sailing, on the Queen Mary Reservoir.

In films, other fiction and the media
The 1857 novel "The Three Clerks" by Anthony Trollope is set in Hampton, which was then a village on the western outskirts of London: "There are still, however, some nooks within reach of the metropolis which have not been be-villaged and be-terraced out of all look of rural charm, and the little village of Hampton, with its old-fashioned country inn, and its bright, quiet, grassy river, is one of them..." The area is also featured briefly in two Charles Dickens novels. In Oliver Twist, Oliver and Bill Sikes stop in a public house in Hampton on their way to the planned burglary in Chertsey. In Nicholas Nickleby, Sir Mulberry Hawk and Lord Frederick visit the 'Hampton Races', which refers to a racecourse at 'Moulsey Hurst'. It is also briefly mentioned in The War of the Worlds. The Bell public house in Hampton is mentioned in T S Eliot's Old Possum's Book of Practical Cats. Hampton is also mentioned in humorist Jerome K. Jerome's Three Men in a Boat. In 24: Live Another Day terrorist Margot Al-Harazi's first hideout is stated to be in Hampton.

A murder at the outset of 2001 took place in a spate across a wide suburban area at the hands of Levi Bellfield since which there has been relatively few unprovoked attacks of such a scale in this district.

Demography and housing

2011 Census ethnicities

In all three wards, White British is the largest ethnic group, ranging between 73.1 percent in Hampton North to 79.6 percent in Hampton. The second largest ethnicity in all three wards is Other White, between 7 and 8 percent. The third largest ethnicity is Indian in Hampton; Other Asian in Hampton North; and White Irish in Fulwell and Hampton.

Transport
Roads
In keeping with its lack of high rise buildings, the district has no dual carriageways, its main routes the A308 and A312, have in their busiest sections an additional filter or bus lane.

Bus routes that serve Hampton are the 111, 216, R68 and R70. The 411 and 285 serve Hampton Court and Hampton Hill respectively.

Rail
The main station is towards the south-west and by the main parades of shops on either side of the line: Hampton; just north of Hampton Hill is Fulwell railway station; both are on the Shepperton Branch Line.  Just south of Hampton Court neighbourhood, clustered about the Tudor, Stuart and Georgian Palace and Gardens is Hampton Court railway station on the Hampton Court Branch Line. Hampton Wick railway station is on the Kingston Loop Line.  The London terminus for both lines is London Waterloo.

Nearest places
 Twickenham
 Sunbury
 Fulwell
 Hanworth
 Teddington
 Whitton
 West Molesey
 East Molesey
 Esher
 Hampton Wick
 Kingston

See also
Hampton Cemetery

Notes and references
Notes

References

External links
  
 One Hampton 
 Our Hampton
 Hampton Online
 Hampton People's Network 
 Hampton Youth Project
 Hampton Water Works
 The 9am Tuesday Chlorine Warning Siren Test
 The Thames from Hampton Court to Sunbury Lock – Hampton Waterworks
 The Twickenham Museum

 
Areas of London
Districts of London on the River Thames
Districts of the London Borough of Richmond upon Thames
Places formerly in Middlesex
Wards of the London Borough of Richmond upon Thames